Felice Cavaliere (born January 23, 1981 in Tivoli) is an Italian professional football player who is currently unattached.

External links
 

1981 births
Living people
Italian footballers
Italy youth international footballers
U.S. Viterbese 1908 players
Treviso F.B.C. 1993 players
Frosinone Calcio players
Association football defenders